Raphaël Personnaz (born 23 July 1981) is a French actor. He has appeared in more than fifty films since 1998. He was awarded the Prix Patrick Dewaere in 2013.

Personal life
Born 23 July 1981 in France, his father was a furniture designer and his mother, a translator of contemporary Greek poets, Personnaz began his career mainly in the theatre. He trained at the conservatory of the twentieth arrondissement of Paris.

Filmography

Theatre

Interesting Facts
His birthdate (that is 23.07.81) is the first date that can be found in pi digits (64th - 69th digits).

References

External links 

 

1981 births
Living people
French male film actors
French National Academy of Dramatic Arts alumni
Cours Florent alumni
21st-century French male actors
French male television actors
French male stage actors
20th-century French male actors
Most Promising Actor Lumières Award winners
Male actors from Paris